The 1942 Coupe de France Final was a football match held at Stade Olympique Yves-du-Manoir, Colombes on May 17, 1942, that saw Red Star Olympique defeat FC Sète 2–0 thanks to goals by Henri Joncourt at 45 minutes, and Alfred Aston at 72 minutes.

Match details

See also
Coupe de France 1941-1942

References

External links
Coupe de France results at Rec.Sport.Soccer Statistics Foundation
Report on French federation site

Coupe De France Final
1942
Coupe De France Final 1942
Coupe De France Final 1942
Sport in Hauts-de-Seine
Coupe de France Final
Coupe de France Final